Norbert Kostel (born 28 July 1966) is an Austrian former cyclist. He competed in the team time trial at the 1988 Summer Olympics.

References

External links
 

1966 births
Living people
Austrian male cyclists
Olympic cyclists of Austria
Cyclists at the 1988 Summer Olympics
Place of birth missing (living people)